Chiroplast is an instrument to guide the hands and fingers of pupils in playing on the piano, invented by Johann Bernhard Logier.

The instrument was a sliding wooden frame that placed the wrist, thumb and fingers of a hand above five consecutive white keys of a keyboard, to overcome the difficulty of retaining their proper position by beginners. It was patented on 28 April 1814, patent no. 3806 "Apparatus for facilitating the acquirement of proper execution on the piano forte". The use of Chiroplast caused a good deal of criticism and controversy.

References

Musical instrument parts and accessories
Piano